The 2002 UMass Minutemen football team represented the University of Massachusetts Amherst in the 2002 NCAA Division I-AA football season as a member of the Atlantic 10 Conference.  The team was coached by Mark Whipple and played its home games at Warren McGuirk Alumni Stadium in Hadley, Massachusetts. The 2002 season saw UMass return to the top half of the conference, as they finished the season with a record of 8–4 overall and 6–3 in conference play.

Schedule

References

UMass
UMass Minutemen football seasons
UMass Minutemen football